Christine Harrison-Bloomfield (born February 12, 1968) is a former athlete from the United Kingdom who mainly competed in the track events of 100m and 200m. She has also competed in the pole vault.

Coaching 
As of 2020 she is an athletics coach and has worked with Christine Ohuruogu, Asha Philip and Jodie Williams. She currently coaches British 400-meter runner Laviai Nielsen at London's Lee Valley, where she is the only elite-level female coach.

In July 2020, she was named by UK Sport as one of the 27 coaches in a new scheme to increase female representation in a sport. The program sees 27 coaches across 15 sports allowed to develop in a quest to double female representation for the 2024 Paris Olympic and Paralympic games.

References 

1968 births
Living people
British athletics coaches
British female pole vaulters
British female sprinters
Universiade medalists in athletics (track and field)
Universiade silver medalists for Great Britain